Brenda, a feminine given name 

Brenda may also refer to:

 Brenda, a children's author
 BRENDA, an enzyme database
 Brenda & the Tabulations, an American R&B group
 Rural Municipality of Brenda, municipality in Manitoba, Canada
 Kolbjørn Brenda, a Norwegian actor
 1609 Brenda, a stony asteroid of the asteroid belt

See also 

 Brenta (disambiguation)